Omri Marcus (born 1979) is a comedy writer and the founder of Comedy for a Change - an international conference on the power of comedy to drive forward social change.

Marcus was formerly a development partner at ProSiebenSat.1's Red Arrow Entertainment Group. Prior to that he was a senior writer on Israel’s top comedy panel show, as well as a consultant of Israeli production companies in analyzing global TV and new-media trends.

As a director in the development department for Israel’s leading TV network, Channel 2 Reshet, Marcus is credited with the creation of the original dating show Buzz Off, recently optioned to France, Spain, Ireland and China.

Over the last 15 years, Marcus has been involved in the development and writing of numerous major entertainment shows on Israeli TV. Among his successes is Eretz Nehederet (What a Wonderful Country), enjoying regular ratings of over 30% and winning four Israeli Academy Awards.

Marcus also writes regularly for numerous leading American and European papers and blogs (Huffington Post, Tablet, MediaPost etc.) about Israeli current affairs and TV business.

In 2009 the Format Academy for Entertainment, Television & New Media (EMC), granted Marcus its prestigious fellowship, given to professionals involved in designing the media of the future.

In his spare time, Marcus runs a unique Israeli-Palestinian tech venture and volunteers at Eye from Zion, a humanitarian organization that performs free medical surgeries in third-world countries.

Notes

External links
 Profile piece in Tablet Magazine
Article in the New York Times
 Interview with the writers of Eretz Nehederet
 King of Comedy in C21Media

1979 births
Living people
Israeli male comedians
Israeli male screenwriters